The term tropic refers to the tropics, a region of the Earth surrounding the Equator.

Tropic or Tropics may also refer to:

Places and geography
 Tropic of Cancer
 Tropic of Capricorn
 Tropic, Florida, a town in the United States
 Tropic, Utah, a town in the United States

Sports
 Miami Tropics (American football), a professional football team
 Miami Tropics, a team in the Premier Basketball League
 TSV Oberhaching Tropics, a German basketball team
 West Palm Beach Tropics, Senior Professional Baseball Association

Other uses
 SS Tropic (1871)
 SS Tropic (1904), see List of White Star Line ships
 Tropic (Josep Renau), a 1945 painting by Spanish artist Josep Renau
 Tropic (magazine), a Sunday magazine published as an insert to the Miami Herald
 Time-Resolved Observations of Precipitation structure and storm Intensity with a Constellation of Smallsats (TROPICS), a NASA spacecraft mission
 Tropic Skincare, a British cosmetic products marketing company

See also

Trophic (disambiguation)
Tropical (disambiguation)